Resorts World Miami is the name of a major  development proposed for the Omni District of Greater Downtown Miami, Florida, USA, by the Malaysian-based Genting Group. At  and with an estimated cost of US$3.2 billion, it is considered one of the largest developments in the history of the state. The project was postponed several times as gambling measures failed at the state level. As of August, 2022, the property remains cleared, but no development has begun. As a concession for rights to build the large Casino project, Genting has proposed to build the long-sought BayLink system as a monorail linking Miami to Miami Beach, connecting to a new Metromover station within their project.

Proposed Attractions
The plan, which includes a large eight story podium and several stylized skyscrapers, is proposed for several lots recently purchased by Genting, including the site of the Miami Herald and El Nuevo Herald headquarters building, which was demolished, and the adjacent Omni International Mall. It will contain a casino, bars and nightclubs, a luxury galleria consisting of vast amounts of retail, restaurants, entertainment and convention space as well as other unique amenities, including one of the largest swimming pools in the world. Two condominium towers will also have 1000 units each.

References

Resorts in Florida
Unbuilt casinos